Metallic may be a reference to:

Metal
Metalloid, metal-like substance
Metallic bonding, type of chemical bonding
Metallicity, in astronomy the proportion of elements other than helium and hydrogen in an object
Metallic color, a color that gives the appearance of metal
Metallic dragon, a classification of dragon found in the role playing game Dungeons & Dragons
Metallic paint, paint that provides the appearance of metal
Heavy metal music, a genre of rock music

See also
Metallica (disambiguation)